Hedrick may refer to:

 Hedrick, Indiana
 Hedrick, Iowa
 Hedrick, Missouri
 Hedrick (surname)